Right Back at Cha! is the fourth album by the Los Angeles, California-based R&B group Dynasty.

Reception

Released in 1982, Produced by group member Leon Sylvers III.

Track listing
Check It Out – (Barbee, Shelby, Spencer)  5:49
Strokin' – (Barbee, Brantley, Randolph, Smith)  5:08
The Only One – (Harris, Lewis)  4:30
Questions – (Carriere, Potts)  3:30
Does That Ring a Bell – (Meyers, Parker, Potts)  3:56
Straight Out – (Meyers, Parker)  3:34
Right Back at Cha! – (Shelby, Spencer, Sylvers)  4:36
That's the Way I Feel About You – (Meyers, Shelby, Spencer)  3:59
I Can't Stop Loving You – (Barbee, Shelby, Shockley)  4:48
All's Fair in Love and War – (Barbee, Sylvers, Sylvers)  4:40

"Strokin'" was sampled on "Signatune" by DJ Mehdi from his 2006 LP, "Lucky Boy".

Charts

Singles

References

External links
 Dynasty-Right Back At Cha! at Discogs

1982 albums
Dynasty (band) albums
SOLAR Records albums
Albums produced by Leon Sylvers III